The Lonchodinae are a subfamily of stick insects in the family Lonchodidae found in: Australasia, Asia, Africa, Southern America and the Pacific.

The subfamilies Necrosciinae and Lonchodinae, formerly part of Diapheromeridae, were determined to make up a separate family and were transferred to the re-established family Lonchodidae in 2018.

Tribes and genera
The Phasmida Species File lists two established tribes:

Eurycanthini 
Authority: Brunner von Wattenwyl, 1893
 Asprenas Stål, 1875
 Brachyrtacus Sharp, 1898
 Canachus Stål, 1875
 Carlius Uvarov, 1939
 Erinaceophasma Zompro, 2001
 Eupromachus Brunner von Wattenwyl, 1907
 Eurycantha Boisduval, 1835
 Labidiophasma Carl, 1915
 Microcanachus Donskoff, 1988
 Neopromachus Giglio-Tos, 1912
 Oreophasma Günther, 1929
 Paracanachus Carl, 1915
 Symetriophasma Hennemann & Conle, 1996
 Thaumatobactron Günther, 1929
 Trapezaspis Redtenbacher, 1908

Lonchodini 
Authority: Brunner von Wattenwyl, 1893 (synonym Menexenini)

 Acanthomenexenus Brock & Hennemann, 2009
 Austrocarausius Brock, 2000
 Baculofractum Zompro, 1995
 Breviphetes Zompro, 1998
 Carausius Stål, 1875
 Chondrostethus Kirby, 1896
 Cladomimus Carl, 1915
 Denhama Werner, 1912
 Echinothorax Günther, 1932
 Gibbopromachus Hennemann, 2021
 Greenia Kirby, 1896
 Hermagoras Stål, 1875
 Hyrtacus Stål, 1875
 Leprocaulinus Uvarov, 1940
 Lonchodes Gray, 1835
 Lonchodiodes Hennemann & Conle, 2007
 Manduria Stål, 1877
 Matutumetes Hennemann & Conle, 2007
 Menexenus Stål, 1875
 Mithrenes Stål, 1877
 Mnesilochus Stål, 1877
 Mortites Günther, 1935
 Myronides Stål, 1875
 Neomyronides Hennemann, 2021
 Paramanduria Hennemann, 2021
 Paraprisomera Hennemann, 2002
 Pericentropsis Günther, 1936
 Pericentrus Redtenbacher, 1908
 Periphetes Stål, 1877
 Phenacephorus Brunner von Wattenwyl, 1907
 Phenacocephalus Werner, 1930
 Phraortes Stål, 1875
 Prisomera Gray, 1835
 Pseudostheneboea Carl, 1913
 Spinacephorus Seow-Choen, 2020
 Spinophetes Zompro & Eusebio, 2000
 Staelonchodes Kirby, 1904
 Stalocagorus Seow-Choen, 2018
 Stheneboea Stål, 1875

Incertae Sedis and Re-Named 
 Megalophasma Bi, 1995
 Megalophasma asperatum (Bates, 1865)
 Megalophasma granulatum Bi, 1995
 Papuacocelus papuanus Hennemann & Conle, 2006

The tribe Neohiraseini Hennemann & Conle, 2008 is now considered a junior synonym in the family Diapheromeridae: subfamily Necrosciinae.

References

External links
 
 

Lonchodidae
Phasmatodea subfamilies